Anna Marijke Overhoff (born 12 June 1980) is a Dutch woman cricketer. She made her WODI debut in her only international appearance in 2006 against Ireland.

References

External links 
 

1980 births
Living people
Dutch women cricketers
Netherlands women One Day International cricketers
Sportspeople from The Hague